Al Mansheiya Bridge is a bridge that links the capital Khartoum and the industrial city Khartoum North across the Blue Nile in central Sudan.

Bridges in Sudan
Buildings and structures in Khartoum
Khartoum North